Lauritsen is a surname. Notable people with this surname include:

Charles Christian Lauritsen, Danish-American physicist
Børge Johannes Lauritsen, Danish merchant
Janet Lauritsen, American criminologist
Rasmus Lauritsen, Danish footballer

See also
Lauritsen (crater), a crater on the Moon
Lauritsen Cabin, a cabin in Alaska

Danish-language surnames